Lobophytum batarum is a species of the genus Lobophytum found in the Pacific and Indian oceans.

References 

Alcyoniidae